Buscando Pelea is the second  album by Venezuelan iconic pop singer Kiara, It was released in 1990. Both "Es El Amor" and "Con Mi Cara Tan Lavada" were big hits also featured in the Telenovela Pasionaria starting Fernando Carrillo and  Catherine Fulop.

Track listing
 "Quiero Un Ángel"    (Y. Spampinato, F. Madrigal)
 "Buscando Pelea"    (F. Madrigal)
 "De Nuevo Estoy Temblando"   (M. Marinangell,F.P. Maddione, F. Madrigal, P. Manavello)
 "Yo Si Yo"   (Tonny Cicco, P. Manavello, F. Madrigal)
 "El Acomplejado"   (P. Manavello, F. Madrigal)
 "Con Mi Cara Tan Lavada"   (P. Manavello, F. Madrigal)
 "Es El Amor"   (P. Manavello, F. Madrigal)
 "Que Va Ser De Mi"   (P. Manavello, F. Madrigal)
 "Muerdo El Juego"   (F. Madrigal)
 "Deseo Eres Tu"   (P. Manavello, F. Madrigal)

1990 albums